Calochilus platychilus is a plant in the orchid family Orchidaceae and is endemic to New South Wales. It was first formally described in 2008 by David Jones and the description was published in The Orchadian from a specimen collected on Black Mountain in the A.C.T. The specific epithet (platychilus) is derived from the Ancient Greek words πλατύς (platús) meaning “flat” and cheilos meaning "lip".

References

External links
 
 

platychilus
Plants described in 2008
Endemic orchids of Australia
Orchids of New South Wales
Orchids of the Australian Capital Territory